The Macpherson-Grant Baronetcy, of Ballindalloch in the County of Elgin, was a title in the Baronetage of the United Kingdom. It was created on 25 July 1838 for George Macpherson-Grant, Member of Parliament for Sutherland intermittently from 1809 to 1826. The third Baronet was MP for Elginshire and Nairnshire from 1879 to 1886, and was also deputy lieutenant of Elginshire, Invernesshire and Banffshire.

Macpherson-Grant baronets, of Ballindalloch (1838)
Sir George Macpherson-Grant, 1st Baronet FRSE (1781–1846) MP for Sutherland
Sir John Macpherson-Grant, 2nd Baronet (1804–1850)
Sir George Macpherson-Grant, 3rd Baronet (1839–1907)
Sir John Macpherson-Grant, 4th Baronet (1863–1914)
Sir George Macpherson-Grant, 5th Baronet (1890–1951)
Sir Ewan George Macpherson-Grant, 6th Baronet (1907–1983)

References

Extinct baronetcies in the Baronetage of the United Kingdom